Zhan Shuping (born 24 April 1964) is a Chinese former basketball player who competed in the 1992 Summer Olympics.

References

1964 births
Living people
Chinese women's basketball players
Olympic basketball players of China
Basketball players at the 1992 Summer Olympics
Olympic silver medalists for China
Olympic medalists in basketball
Basketball players from Liaoning
Medalists at the 1992 Summer Olympics
Chinese women's basketball coaches